Michael Howard (born 1983/1984) is an American politician serving in the Minnesota House of Representatives since 2019. A member of the Minnesota Democratic–Farmer–Labor Party (DFL), Howard represents District 51A in the south-central Twin Cities metropolitan area, which includes the city of Richfield and parts of Minneapolis in Hennepin County, Minnesota.

Early life, education, and career
Howard was raised in Becker, Minnesota. He attended Augsburg College, graduating with a Bachelor of Arts in political science. During college, he was an intern for U.S. Senator Paul Wellstone's campaign in 2002.

After graduating, Howard worked as a personal care assistant for children with autism. He worked on Mike Freeman's election campaign for Hennepin County attorney in 2006. Soon after, he began working for the DFL caucus in the Minnesota House of Representatives in 2007 and became its communications director in 2008, a position he held until 2017.

Howard was elected a member of the Richfield city council in 2014 and served until 2018.

Minnesota House of Representatives
Howard was first elected to the Minnesota House of Representatives in 2018, after the retirement of DFL incumbent Linda Slocum, and has been reelected every two years since.

Howard served as an assistant majority leader during the 2021-2022 biennium. He is the chair of the Housing Finance and Policy Committee, and sits on the Rules and Legislative Administration, Taxes, and Ways and Means Committees.

Election history

Personal life
Howard and his wife, Sarah, have one child. He has lived in Richfield, Minnesota since 2010.

References

External links

 Official House of Representatives website
 Official campaign website

1980s births
Living people
People from Richfield, Minnesota
Augsburg University alumni
Minnesota city council members
Democratic Party members of the Minnesota House of Representatives
21st-century American politicians